Pleasure Principle is a fashion label founded in 2002 and is a collaboration between New York-based artists/designers Adrian Cowen and Diva Pittala.

The inspiration for the collection was to bring a conceptual artistic approach to fashion design, particularly to the area of sportswear.
This initially took the form of developing garments from jersey that can be worn in multiple ways but are restrained in construction by the parameters of the T-shirt.

Graphic elements are designed to offer glimpses of an imagined identity, and are intended to reflect the dark side of pleasure - hence the Freudian 'pleasure principle' name.

The collection is today represented by retailers such as Seven New York, Assembly New York, Luisa Via Roma, Corso Como Seoul, Harvey Nichols HK, La Garçonne, Maxfield, and Apartment in Berlin.

Clothing brands of the United States

References